Ines Diers (later Noack; born 2 November 1963, in Rochlitz) is a former freestyle swimmer from East Germany. At age sixteen she won a total number of five medals at the boycotted 1980 Summer Olympics in Moscow, USSR.

References

External links
 
 
 

1963 births
Living people
People from Rochlitz
German female swimmers
German female freestyle swimmers
Swimmers at the 1980 Summer Olympics
Olympic swimmers of East Germany
Olympic gold medalists for East Germany
Olympic silver medalists for East Germany
Olympic bronze medalists for East Germany
World record setters in swimming
Olympic bronze medalists in swimming
European Aquatics Championships medalists in swimming
Recipients of the Patriotic Order of Merit
Medalists at the 1980 Summer Olympics
Olympic gold medalists in swimming
Olympic silver medalists in swimming
Sportspeople from Saxony